Sir John Clarke MacDermott, PC (9 May 1927 – 13 December 2022) was a Northern Ireland barrister and judge.

Biography 

MacDermott was born on 9 May 1927, as the son of the judge John MacDermott, Baron MacDermott and Louise Palmer Johnston, oldest daughter of the Rev. J. C. Johnston, DD. He was educated at Campbell College, Belfast, Trinity Hall, Cambridge (BA), and Queen's University Belfast.

MacDermott was called to English Bar by the Inner Temple and the Bar of Northern Ireland in 1949 and became a Northern Irish Queen's Counsel in 1964. He was appointed a Justice of the High Court of Northern Ireland in 1973. In 1987, he was made a Lord Justice of Appeal, and was knighted and sworn of the Privy Council. He retired from the bench in 1998.

McDermott died on 13 December 2022, at the age of 95.

References

Sources 
 Judge's retiring breaks long link, irishtimes.com. Accessed 25 January 2023.

1927 births
2022 deaths
Knights Bachelor
Sons of life peers
People educated at Campbell College
Alumni of Trinity Hall, Cambridge
Alumni of Queen's University Belfast
Members of the Inner Temple
Barristers from Northern Ireland
Members of the Privy Council of the United Kingdom
High Court judges of Northern Ireland
Lords Justice of Appeal of Northern Ireland
Northern Ireland King's Counsel